Mylothris nubila is a butterfly in the family Pieridae. It is found in Cameroon, Gabon, São Tomé and Príncipe, the Democratic Republic of the Congo and Uganda.

The larvae feed on Santalales species.

Subspecies
M. n. nubila (Cameroon, Gabon, São Tomé and Príncipe)
M. n. canescens Joicey & Talbot, 1922 (Democratic Republic of the Congo)
M. n. fontainei Berger, 1952 (Democratic Republic of the Congo)
M. n. somereni Talbot, 1946 (Uganda: western slopes of Mount Elgon)

References

Seitz, A. Die Gross-Schmetterlinge der Erde 13: Die Afrikanischen Tagfalter. Plate XIII 11

Butterflies described in 1884
Pierini
Butterflies of Africa